Ralph Henry Ridley (14 April 1904 – ?) was an English professional footballer who played as a goalkeeper in the Football League for Ashington and York City and in non-League football for Chopwell and Consett.

References

1904 births
People from Haltwhistle
Footballers from Northumberland
English footballers
Association football goalkeepers
Ashington A.F.C. players
York City F.C. players
Consett A.F.C. players
English Football League players
Year of death missing